Au diable la vertu, is a French comedy film from 1954, directed by Jean Laviron, written by François Chalais, starring Henri Génès and Louis de Funès. The scenario was based on the work of Jean Guitton – "Elle attendait ça".

Cast 
 Henri Génès : Pierre Montabel, businessman
 Liliane Bert : Gisèle Montabel, wife Pierre
 Julien Carette : Mr Tellier, the manager of the private agency
 Maurice Regamey : Jacques Lambert, the associate of Pierre
 Félix Oudart : the Merciful canon, the brother of Miss de St-Hilaire
 Lili Bontemps : Monique, the friend of Jacques
 Christian Duvaleix : Robert Crémieux, the thief
 Louis de Funès : Mr Lorette, the clerk of the judge of education
 Robert Vattier : the judge of education
 Catherine Gay : Rita Johnson, the stripper
 Simone Paris : Mss de St-Hilaire, the limited partner
 Josselin : Maître Nivert, the lawyer having lost the voice of Pierre
 Albert Rémy : Henri, the servant of "Montabel"
 Gaston Orbal : Norbert Demorey, the president of the association
 Frédéric Bart : the inspector Perrini
 Jim Gérald : the movie director of striptease
 Nicole Jonesco : Hélène
 Jack Ary : the state trooper of nurse
 André Numès Fils : the agent bringing convocation
 Crésus : the fiancé of Hélène
 André Dalibert : a spectator in striptease

References

External links 
 
 Au diable la vertu (1953) at the Films de France

1953 films
French comedy films
1950s French-language films
French black-and-white films
Films directed by Jean Laviron
1953 comedy films
1950s French films